Cementville is an unincorporated community in Jeffersonville Township, Clark County, Indiana.

History
A post office was established at Cementville in 1869, and remained in operation until it was discontinued in 1904. Production of cement in the area caused the name to be selected.

Geography

References

Unincorporated communities in Clark County, Indiana
Unincorporated communities in Indiana
Louisville metropolitan area